Royce H. Savage (March 31, 1904 – December 27, 1993) was a United States district judge of the United States District Court for the Northern District of Oklahoma.

Education and career

Born in Blanco, Indian Territory (now Oklahoma), Savage received an Artium Baccalaureus degree from the University of Oklahoma in 1925, and a Bachelor of Laws from the University of Oklahoma College of Law in 1927. He was in private practice in Tulsa, Oklahoma from 1929 to 1938 and in Oklahoma City, Oklahoma from 1938 to 1940.

Federal judicial service

Savage was nominated by President Franklin D. Roosevelt on September 24, 1940, to a seat on the United States District Court for the Northern District of Oklahoma vacated by Judge Franklin Elmore Kennamer. He was confirmed by the United States Senate on September 27, 1940, and received his commission on October 1, 1940. He served as Chief Judge from 1949 to 1961. His service terminated on October 31, 1961, due to his resignation.

Post judicial service and death

After his resignation from the federal bench, Savage was General Counsel for Gulf Oil Corporation from 1961 to 1969, and returned afterward to private practice in Tulsa. He died on December 27, 1993, in Tulsa.

References

Sources
 
 Royce H. Savage's obituary 

1904 births
1993 deaths
People from Pittsburg County, Oklahoma
University of Oklahoma alumni
University of Oklahoma College of Law alumni
Judges of the United States District Court for the Northern District of Oklahoma
United States district court judges appointed by Franklin D. Roosevelt
20th-century American judges